CHOC is a quarterly women's Pan Arab social magazine, established in 2002. The magazine is based in Dubai, United Arab Emirates. It generally covers topics such as fashion, beauty, sex, celebrities and travel.

References

External links
Official site

Magazines established in 2002
Mass media in Dubai
Quarterly magazines
Women's magazines
Women's fashion magazines

fr:Choc (magazine)